"Something I Need" is a song recorded by American pop rock band OneRepublic. It was released on August 25, 2013, through Mosley Music and Interscope Records as the third single from their third studio album, Native (2013). The song was written and produced by Ryan Tedder and Benny Blanco. It peaked at number six in Australia, where it has been certified 3× Platinum, and number four in New Zealand, where it has been certified Gold.

Background
On August 23, 2013, in a response to a question from an Australian fan on Twitter,  OneRepublic revealed that "Something I Need" would be the next single released from Native. The track debuted on Australian radio on August 25 and premiered on U.S. radio in mid-September.

Chart performance
The song peaked at number six in Australia, where it has been certified 3× Platinum for sales of over 210,000. In New Zealand, it charted at number four and has been certified Gold after selling 7,500 copies. The song has also charted at number one in Poland, number five in Austria, number 72 in Germany and number 21 in Switzerland.

Music video
The official music video was filmed in September 2013 and was directed by Cameron Duddy. Speaking about the video via their Twitter page, OneRepublic said: "The video for 'Something I Need' will hands down be the craziest video we've done. And funniest. And hopefully best. Time for a risk." The music video was released on October 7, 2013. In the video, a man is repeatedly attacked by a dog in slow motion, preventing him from asking his crush out.

Credits and personnel
Recording
Recorded at Black Rock Studio, Santorini, Greece
Additional recordings at Lotzah Matzah Studios, New York City, New York; Patriot Studios, Denver, Colorado; Downtown Studios, New York City, New York, and Audiophile Studios, New Orleans, Louisiana
Mixed at MixStar Studios, Virginia Beach, Virginia
Mastered at Sterling Sound, New York

Personnel
Ryan Tedder – songwriter, producer, instrumentation, programming, engineer
Benny Blanco – songwriter, producer, instrumentation, programming, backing vocals
Serban Ghenea – mixer
John Hanes – engineered for mix
Phil Seaford – assistant engineered for mix
Smith Carlson – engineer
Chris Sclafani – engineer, backing vocals
Scott "Yarmov" Yarmovsky – assistant engineer, backing vocals
OneRepublic – backing vocals
Danielle Edinburgh Wilson – backing vocals
Margaret-Anne Davis – backing vocals
Toni Skidmore – backing vocals
Jermon Wilson – backing vocals
Ryan's friends and family after a night of drinking – backing vocals (legend)
Chris Gehringer – mastering
Will Quinnell – mastering

Charts and certifications

Weekly charts

Year-end charts

Certifications

Ben Haenow version

In December 2014, Ben Haenow, winner of the eleventh series of The X Factor, released a cover version of "Something I Need" as his winner's single after he won. The song was released as a digital download in the United Kingdom on December 14, with a physical equivalent being released three days later. "Something I Need" was produced by American recording artist John Ryan, who has previously worked with One Direction. All proceeds from the single will go to the children's charity organisation Together for Short Lives.

The song debuted at number one on the UK Singles Chart, making it the Christmas number one. It was the final X-Factor winner's single to reach number one.

Background
On December 12, 2014, the winner's singles for each of the three finalists of eleventh series of The X Factor were revealed. Haenow and Fleur East would record "Something I Need", whilst Andrea Faustini would record Whitney Houston's "I Didn't Know My Own Strength". On December 14, Haenow and eventual runner-up East both performed the song live on The X Factor final.

This version of the song substitutes the words "die" and "killing" in the pre-chorus and chorus in favor of the words "here", "live" and "loving", presumably to make it more palatable for The X Factor audience, particularly younger viewers.

Live performances
Haenow performed "Something I Need" on The X Factor live final results show, just after being announced as the winner. He also sang it on Text Santa on December 19.

On January 21, 2015, Haenow performed the song at the 20th National Television Awards.

Chart performance
The song debuted at number two in the Republic of Ireland, beaten to the top spot by Mark Ronson and Bruno Mars' "Uptown Funk" (which ironically received an early release because it was performed on The X Factor by eventual runner-up Fleur East). It became the first X Factor winner's single to miss the number one spot in Ireland since Steve Brookstein's "Against All Odds" in 2004. In the UK, the song debuted at number one on the UK Singles Chart, becoming the 2014 Christmas number one. The song sold 214,239 copies in its first week, becoming the second-fastest selling single of 2014 (behind Band Aid 30's "Do They Know It's Christmas?"). It was also the year's 58th best-selling song. ("Uptown Funk" would finish at number two on Christmas 2014, and at the same time would become the final number one song of 2014 and first of 2015 in Australia, Canada and the United States in addition to Ireland).

Track listing

Credits and personnel
Ben Haenow – lead vocals, backing vocals
Ryan Tedder – songwriting
Benny Blanco – songwriting
John Ryan – guitar, keyboards, producer, programming, backing vocals
DIVA Singers – choir
Ash Howes – mixer
Matt Brind – strings arrangement
Mat Bartram – recording
Ronan Phelan – assistant engineer
Isobel Griffiths – contractor
Dick Beetham – mastering

Credits adapted from CD single.

Charts and certifications

Weekly charts

Year-end charts

Certifications

Release history

References

2013 singles
Interscope Records singles
Mosley Music Group singles
Number-one singles in Poland
Number-one singles in Scotland
OneRepublic songs
Songs written for films
Songs written by Benny Blanco
Song recordings produced by Benny Blanco
Songs written by Ryan Tedder
Song recordings produced by Ryan Tedder
2014 debut singles
UK Singles Chart number-one singles
2013 songs
Christmas number-one singles in the United Kingdom
Music videos directed by Cameron Duddy